Yellow orange tip may refer to:

 Colotis auxo, a butterfly of Transvaal and Botswana
 Colotis incretus, a butterfly of Kenya, Burundi, Tanzania and Zambia
 Ixias pyrene, a butterfly of India, parts of the Himalayas, and parts of Indochina

Animal common name disambiguation pages